List of conferences in Cairo
 Cairo Conference (1921), the British government conference following World War I which established the British policy for the Middle East
 The two World War II conferences in 1943 which established the Allied war strategy in Asia, codenamed Sextant:
 Cairo Conference (1943)
 Second Cairo Conference of 1943
 1961 Preparatory Meeting of the Non-Alignment Countries (1961)
 2nd Summit of the Non-Aligned Movement (1964)
 International Conference on Population and Development of 1994
 Cairo Anti-war Conference of 2002-2009
 Various Arab League summits held in Cairo:
 1964 Arab League summit (Cairo)
 1970 Arab League summit
 1976 Arab League summit (Cairo)

See also
 Cairo Declaration on Human Rights in Islam (1990)

 
Conferences
Conferences
Conferences in Cairo
Conferences in Cairo